Bossiaea oxyclada is a species of flowering plant in the family Fabaceae and is endemic to the south of Western Australia. It is an erect, rigid shrub with flattened branches, cladodes ending with a sharp point, leaves mostly reduced to small scales, and golden yellow and deep red flowers.

Description

Taxonomy and naming
Bossiaea oxyclada was first formally described in 1853 by Nikolai Turczaninow in the Bulletin de la Société impériale des naturalistes de Moscou from specimens collected by James Drummond. The specific epithet (oxyclada) means "sharp branch".

Distribution and habitat
This bossiaea is found in the western part of the Fitzgerald River National Park in the Esperance Plains and Mallee biogeographic regions, where it grows in a sandplain community with scattered eucalypts.

Conservation status
Bossiaea oxyclada is classified as "Priority Four" by the Government of Western Australia Department of Parks and Wildlife, meaning that it is rare or near threatened.

References

oxyclada
Flora of Western Australia
Taxa named by Nikolai Turczaninow
Plants described in 1853